Bengaluru East railway station, also known as Bangalore East railway station (station code: BNCE) is an old British Era Railway Station surrounded by Pottery Road, Kumaraswamy Naidu Road, Murgesha Mudaliar Road and Kenchappa Road, is a small quaint station located in Fraser Town, Bangalore Cantonment. This station is very convenient for residents traveling towards or returning from Kolar Gold Fields or Madras. Express and Mail trains did not stop here till the 1920s. The station is now renovated with a larger platform. Adjacent to railway station, there is the Bangalore East Football Grounds, which nowadays is more used for playing Cricket. Well known cartoonist Paul Fernandes remembers as a young boy befriending train drivers at this station, and getting grease for his bicycle.

History
According to the 'List of Mysore Residency records, from the year 1880–1947', the Bangalore East railway station was constructed in 1906, on the Bangalore–Madras railway line. At that time, the trains from Madras terminated at the Bangalore Cantonment railway station, in Bangalore Civil and Military Station which was controlled by the British Madras Presidency. The Bangalore City station in the Bangalore Pete (under the control of the Maharaja of Mysore), was used to connect to Mysore State. The railway line has existed since starting operations in 1864, with the launch of the Bangalore Cantonment–Jolarpettai train services by the Madras Railway. The train line was broad-gauge and 149 km long, connecting the Bangalore Cantonment with Vellore district.

Recent developments
Recently in a bid to give a face-lift to the Bangalore East Railway Station, the Indian Railways started 5 new booking counters at the station. As the Express trains do not halt at this station, there has been a long-standing demand from residents of the surrounding suburbs of Fraser Town, Cox Town, Bharathinagar, Sevanagar, Jeevanahalli, Banaswadi and Kammanahalli, for all trains to stop at this station. As they are being forced to use the Bangalore Cantonment railway station, which is located at a distance.

Gallery

References

External links

Bangalore Civil and Military Station
Railway stations in Bangalore
Railway stations opened in 1906
1906 establishments in India